Korea Camera Museum is a photography museum in Gwacheon, Gyeonggi-do, South Korea.

See also
List of museums in South Korea

External links
Official site

Museums in Gyeonggi Province
Photography museums and galleries in South Korea
Photographic technology museums